"Me or You?" is a single by Killing Joke. It was released by E.G. Records in October 1983 as a 12", 7", and limited double vinyl 7" single, including the B-side "Wilful Days". The single reached No. 57 in the UK Singles Chart that month. Both "Me or You?" and "Wilful Days" were later included on the 2008 reissue of Fire Dances.

Track listings 
For the 12" release, the B-side "Wilful Days" was joined by "Feast of Blaze" from the album Fire Dances. The limited double vinyl 7" single featured "Wilful Days" as a C-side with a blank D-side.

7" vinyl single

Side A
"Me or You?" – 03:02

Side B
"Wilful Days" – 05:01

7" double vinyl single

Side A
"Me or You?" – 03:02

Side B
"Feast of Blaze" – 03:35

Side C
"Wilful Days" – 05:01

Side D
blank

12" vinyl single

Side A
"Me or You?" – 03:02
"Feast of Blaze" – 03:35

Side B
"Wilful Days" – 05:01

Charts

References 

1983 songs
Killing Joke songs
Songs written by Jaz Coleman
Songs written by Geordie Walker
Songs written by Paul Raven (musician)
Songs written by Paul Ferguson
E.G. Records singles